The 422nd Maryland General Assembly convened in a special session on June 14, 2006, met on June 15, 2006, and did not meet again until it adjourned sine die on June 23, 2006. The entire special session covered only three calendar days.

Senate

Party composition

Leadership

Members

House of Delegates

Party composition

Leadership

Members

See also
List of current members of the Maryland Senate

References
General
 
 
 
 

Specific

External links
Maryland General Assembly

4
2006 in Maryland